Clifton Russell "Clif" Richardson (May 30, 1944 – March 6, 2020) was an American politician.

He was elected as a Republican to represent Louisiana's 65th house district in East Baton Rouge Parish in 2007 and was re-elected in 2011. An aide lodged a sexual harassment allegation against him for what Richardson characterized as a joke of a sexual nature. The state of Louisiana paid out $50,000 to settle the claim in May 2012. He resigned on January 2, 2013, due to cancer. He served in the U.S. Navy during the Vietnam War, and Louisiana Governor John Bel Edwards ordered flags to fly at half-staff following Richardson's death.

References

1944 births
2020 deaths
Republican Party members of the Louisiana House of Representatives